The Austrian Oberliga is the third level of ice hockey in Austria. The league lies below the Erste Bank Eishockey Liga, and the Austrian National League.

Participating teams

External links

 OEHV website

3
1968 establishments in Austria
Sports leagues established in 1968
Aus